The discography of Jimmie Rodgers is composed of 111 songs that spanned the blues, jazz and country music genres. His first recording was made on August 4, 1927, during the Bristol sessions. The sessions were organized by Ralph Peer, who became Rodgers' main producer. Rodgers enjoyed success. At the height of his career, he made US$75,000 in royalties in 1929. After the Great Depression, his sales dropped to US$60,000. His last recording session took place in New York City on May 24, 1933. Rodgers died the same night at the Taft Hotel after years of suffering from tuberculosis. 

Music historian Norm Cohen categorized Rodgers' discography in four different types of songs: nineteenth century songs, songs stemming from vaudeville and minstrel shows, traditional songs, and his thirteen Blue Yodels. Rodgers was known as "America's Blue Yodeler" for his signature use of yodeling. Additional to his recordings, he appeared on Columbia Pictures' short The Singing Brakeman. Two versions by different directors were shot, one in 1929 and the second one, the following year. Rodgers was given writing credits on the labels of eighty-nine releases, though he did not compose most of his songs. He was aided by his sister-in-law Elsie McWilliams, who wrote thirty-nine of the songs. Other songs by Rodgers consisted of already existing numbers that originated from traditional, blues or vaudeville show sources. Rodgers modified the tune, lyrics and interpretation "beyond recognition" to create material that his producer, Ralph Peer, could copyright. He added his signature guitar playing and yodeling. Though McWilliams did not desire credits or financial gain for her contributions, and clarified she did it to help Rodgers and the family, the song publisher added her name to the song credits. McWilliams received US$50 for each song, and with her permission some of her writing credits were omitted. Other usual collaborators of Rodgers included Raymond Hall and Waldo O'Neal. 

Rodgers' music directly influenced two generations of musicians including Gene Autry, Roy Rogers, Eddy Arnold, Johnny Cash, Bob Dylan, and George Harrison. Rodgers was elected into the Country Music Hall of Fame with the inaugural class in 1961, to the Songwriters Hall of Fame with the inaugural class in 1970, and to the Rock and Roll Hall of Fame with the inaugural class in 1986 as an "Early Blues Influence".

Recordings

Filmography

References

Sources

Country music discographies
Discographies of American artists
 *